The 81 provinces of Turkey are divided into 973 districts (ilçeler; sing. ilçe). In the early Turkish Republic and in the Ottoman Empire, the corresponding unit was the kaza.

Most provinces bear the same name as their respective provincial capital districts. However, many urban provinces, designated as greater municipalities, have a center consisting of multiple districts, such as the provincial capital of Ankara province, The City of Ankara, comprising nine separate districts. Additionally four provinces, Kocaeli, Sakarya, İçel and Hatay have their capital district named differently from their province, as İzmit, Adapazarı, Mersin and Antakya respectively.

A district may cover both rural and urban areas. In many provinces, one district of a province is designated the central district (merkez ilçe) from which the district is administered.  The central district is administered by an appointed provincial deputy governor and other non-central districts by an appointed sub-governor (kaymakam) from their district center (ilçe merkezi) municipality.  In these central districts the district center municipality also serves as the provincial center municipality.  Both the deputy governor and sub-governors are responsible to the province governor (vali). Greater Municipalities, however, are administrated differently where a separate seat of municipality exists for the entire province, having administrative power over all districts of the province.

Local government

Municipalities (belediye) can be created in, and are subordinate to, the districts in which they are located.  Each district has at least one municipality (belde) in the district center from which both the municipal government for that municipality and the district government is administered. A municipality is headed by an elected mayor (belediye başkanı) who administers the local government for defined municipal matters. More and more settlements which are outside district centers have municipalities as well, usually because their population requires one.  A municipality's borders usually correspond to that of the urban settlement it covers, but may also include some undeveloped land.

Villages (köy) outside municipalities and quarters or neighborhoods (mahalle) within municipalities are the lowest level of local government, and are also the most numerous unit of local government in Turkey.  They elect muhtars to care for specific administrative matters such as residence registration.  The designation slightly differs (köy muhtarı for village muhtar, mahalle muhtarı for quarter muhtar) and the tasks, which are largely similar but are adapted to their locality.

Greater municipalities (büyükşehir belediyesi) exist for large cities like İstanbul and İzmir that consist of an extra administrative layer run by an elected head mayor, who oversee the municipalities and mayors within the province. Currently, 30 provinces are administrated by greater municipalities in addition to having separate municipalities for every district within the province.

List of districts with population
The districts and their populations (as of December 31, 2019) are listed below, by region and by province (with capital district in bold text).

Aegean Region

Aydın Subregion

Aydın Province 

Population: 1,110,972
Bozdoğan: 33,627
Buharkent: 12,793
Çine: 49,339
Didim: 86,688
Efeler: 293,816
Germencik: 43,968
İncirliova: 52,556
Karacasu: 18,389
Karpuzlu: 10,952
Koçarlı: 23,397
Köşk: 27,846
Kuşadası: 116,966
Kuyucak: 26,671
Nazilli: 159,544
Söke: 121,481
Sultanhisar: 20,458
Yenipazar: 12,481

Denizli Province 

Population: 1,037,208
Acıpayam: 55,351
Babadağ: 6,445
Baklan: 5,524
Bekilli: 6,826
Beyağaç: 6,397
Bozkurt: 12,671
Buldan: 27,179
Çal: 18,869
Çameli: 18,039
Çardak: 8,736
Çivril: 60,333
Merkezefendi: 311,177
Pamukkale: 346,625
Güney: 9,802
Honaz: 34,343
Kale: 20,310
Sarayköy: 30,810
Serinhisar: 14,451
Tavas: 43,320

Muğla Province 

Population: 983,142
Bodrum: 175,435
Dalaman: 42,024
Datça: 22,403
Fethiye: 162,686
Kavaklıdere: 10,792
Köyceğiz: 36,926
Marmaris: 94,749
Menteşe: 115,059
Milas: 141,107
Ortaca: 50,027
Seydikemer: 61,657
Ula: 25,402
Yatağan: 44,879

İzmir Subregion

İzmir Province 

Population: 4,367,251
İzmir: 2,972,900
Balçova: 79,681
Bayraklı: 312,264
Bornova: 450,992
Buca: 510,695
Çiğli: 200,211
Gaziemir: 137,808
Güzelbahçe: 33,725
Karabağlar: 480,925
Karşıyaka: 349,290
Konak: 351,572
Narlıdere: 65,737
Northern districts
Aliağa: 96,974
Bergama: 103,867
Dikili: 43,806
Foça: 32,264
Kınık: 28,802
Menemen: 179,881
Southern districts
Bayındır: 40,414
Beydağ: 12,540
Çeşme: 44,363
Karaburun: 10,759
Kemalpaşa: 107,556
Kiraz: 43,925
Menderes: 97,123
Ödemiş: 132,876
Seferihisar: 44,526
Selçuk: 36,824
Tire: 84,804
Torbalı: 185,908
Urla: 67,339

Manisa Subregion

Afyonkarahisar Province 

Population: 729,483
Afyonkarahisar: 306,908
Başmakçı: 9,788
Bayat: 7,673
Bolvadin: 45,384
Çay: 31,179
Çobanlar: 14,363
Dazkırı: 11,204
Dinar: 47,400
Emirdağ: 37,361
Evciler: 7,367
Hocalar: 9,496
İhsaniye: 27,929
İscehisar: 24,683
Kızılören: 2,329
Sandıklı: 55,331
Sinanpaşa: 39,734
Sultandağı: 14,566
Şuhut: 36,788

Kütahya Province 

Population: 579,257
Altıntaş: 16,108
Aslanapa: 8,945
Çavdarhisar: 6,303
Domaniç: 14,652
Dumlupınar: 2,944
Emet: 19,864
Gediz: 50,264
Hisarcık: 12,069
Kütahya: 272,367
Pazarlar: 5,086
Simav: 63,155
Şaphane: 6,030
Tavşanlı: 101,460

Manisa Province 

Population: 1,440,611
Ahmetli: 16,525
Akhisar: 173,026
Alaşehir: 104,622
Demirci: 40,048
Gölmarmara: 15,212
Gördes: 27,703
Kırkağaç: 38,459
Köprübaşı: 13,185
Kula: 44,001
Şehzadeler: 171,138
Yunusemre: 246,440
Salihli: 162,787
Sarıgöl: 35,890
Saruhanlı: 55,340
Selendi: 19,781
Soma: 109,946
Turgutlu: 166,418

Uşak Province 

Population: 370,509
Banaz: 35,778
Eşme: 34,888
Karahallı: 10,139
Sivaslı: 20,387
Ulubey: 12,648
Uşak: 256,669

Central Anatolia

Kayseri Subregion

Kayseri Province 

Population: 1,407,409
Akkışla: 6,247
Bünyan: 30,603
Develi: 65,745
Felahiye: 5,861
Hacılar: 12,414
İncesu: 27,969
Kocasinan: 396,912
Melikgazi: 571,166
Talas: 163,773
Özvatan: 4,164
Pınarbaşı: 24,080
Sarıoğlan: 14,552
Sarız: 9,583
Tomarza: 22,166
Yahyalı: 36,076
Yeşilhisar: 16,098

Sivas Province 

Population: 638,956
Akıncılar: 5,326
Altınyayla: 9,004
Divriği: 16,245
Doğanşar: 2,842
Gemerek: 22,845
Gölova: 3,664
Gürün: 18,771
Hafik: 9,819
İmranlı: 7,668
Kangal: 21,272
Koyulhisar: 12,936
Sivas: 381,325
Suşehri: 25,159
Şarkışla: 38,408
Ulaş: 8,870
Yıldızeli: 32,797
Zara: 22,005

Yozgat Province 

Population: 421,200
Akdağmadeni: 42,621
Aydıncık: 10,079
Boğazlıyan: 34,269
Çandır: 4,450
Çayıralan: 12,563
Çekerek: 19,467
Kadışehri: 11,277
Saraykent: 12,486
Sarıkaya: 32,489
Şefaatli: 15,371
Sorgun: 79,533
Yenifakılı: 5,386
Yerköy: 35,476
Yozgat: 106,280

Kırıkkale Subregion

Aksaray Province 

Population: 416,367
Ağaçören: 7,972
Aksaray: 301,661
Eskil: 26,452
Gülağaç: 19,615
Güzelyurt: 11,223
Ortaköy: 32,639
Sarıyahşi: 5,658
Sultanhanı: 11,147

Kırıkkale Province 

Population: 283,017
Bahsili: 7,399
Balışeyh: 6,478
Çelebi: 2,633
Delice: 9,075
Karakeçili: 3,369
Keskin: 17,620
Kırıkkale: 198,477
Sulakyurt: 6,953
Yahşihan: 31,013

Kırşehir Province 

Population: 242,938
Akçakent: 3,889
Akpınar: 7,465
Boztepe: 5,464
Çiçekdağı: 14,186
Kaman: 35,763
Kırşehir: 157,635
Mucur: 18,536

Nevşehir Province 

Population: 303,010
Acıgöl: 19,362
Avanos: 32,742
Derinkuyu: 20,776
Gülşehir: 21,468
Hacıbektaş: 11,302
Kozaklı: 13,379
Nevşehir: 148,160
Ürgüp: 35,821

Niğde Province 

Population: 362,861
Altunhisar: 12,961
Bor: 60,462
Çamardı: 12,715
Çiftlik: 27,374
Niğde: 229,121
Ulukışla: 20,228

Central-Eastern Anatolia

Malatya Subregion

Bingöl Province 

Population: 279,812
Adaklı: 8,550
Bingöl: 164,835
Genç: 34,181
Karlıova: 29,174
Kiğı: 4,578
Solhan: 33,655
Yayladere: 2,021
Yedisu: 2,818

Elazığ Province 

Population: 591,098
Ağın: 2,626
Alacakaya: 6,151
Arıcak: 14,620
Baskil: 13,764
Elazığ: 439,687
Karakoçan: 28,142
Keban: 7,068
Kovancılar: 39,079
Maden: 11,275
Palu: 19,776
Sivrice: 8,910

Malatya Province 

Population: 800,615
Akçadağ: 29,064
Arapgir: 10,275
Arguvan: 7,626
Darende: 26,166
Doğanşehir: 38,690
Doğanyol: 4,051
Hekimhan: 18,345
Kale: 6,085
Kuluncak: 7,783
Battalgazi: 304,787
Yeşilyurt: 319,618
Pütürge: 13,889
Yazıhan: 13,786

Tunceli Province 

Population: 84,660
Çemişgezek: 7,877
Hozat: 6,255
Mazgirt: 7,778
Nazımiye: 3,189
Ovacık: 6,696
Pertek: 11,063
Pülümür: 3,375
Tunceli: 38,427

Van Subregion

Bitlis Province 

Population: 348,115
Adilcevaz: 30,499
Ahlat: 40,699
Bitlis: 70,699
Güroymak: 47,829
Hizan: 33,331
Mutki: 31,867
Tatvan: 93,189

Hakkâri Province 

Population: 280,991
Çukurca: 16,141
Derecik: 23,377
Hakkâri: 78,622
Şemdinli: 43,886
Yüksekova: 118,915

Muş Province 

Population: 408,809
Bulanık: 80,643
Hasköy: 26,190
Korkut: 24,830
Malazgirt: 50,926
Muş: 195,323
Varto: 30,897

Van Province 

Population: 1,136,757
Bahçesaray: 14,701
Başkale: 48,838
Çaldıran: 62,530
Çatak: 20,592
Edremit: 127,505
Erciş: 175,508
Gevaş: 28,235
Gürpınar: 34,393
Muradiye: 50,206
Özalp: 65,296
Saray: 20,498
İpekyolu: 326,007
Tuşba: 162,848

Eastern Black Sea Region

Ordu Subregion

Giresun Province 

Population: 448,400
Alucra: 10,253
Bulancak: 67,582
Çamoluk: 8,289
Çanakçı: 6,232
Dereli: 19,731
Doğankent: 6,613
Espiye: 35,649
Eynesil: 13,293
Giresun: 138,858
Görele: 31,862
Güce: 7,992
Keşap: 19,693
Piraziz: 14,310
Şebinkarahisar: 20,459
Tirebolu: 31,804
Yağlıdere: 15,793

Gümüşhane Province 

Population: 164,521
Gümüşhane: 56,398
Kelkit: 52,608
Köse: 8,349
Kürtün: 13,376
Şiran: 21,286
Torul: 12,504

Ordu Province

Population: 754,198
Akkuş: 22,192
Altınordu: 217,640
Aybastı: 22,027
Çamaş: 9,058
Çatalpınar: 13,809
Çaybaşı: 12,687
Fatsa: 119,094
Gölköy: 28,332
Gülyalı: 8,269
Gürgentepe: 14,100
İkizce: 14,570
Kabadüz: 7,347
Kabataş: 10,617
Korgan: 28,609
Kumru: 29,945
Mesudiye: 16,809
Perşembe: 31,542
Ulubey: 19,450
Ünye: 128,101

Trabzon Subregion

Artvin Province 

Population: 170,815
Ardanuç: 11,449
Arhavi: 20,926
Artvin: 35,186
Borçka: 22,831
Hopa: 26,958
Kemalpaşa: 9,224
Murgul: 7,031
Şavşat: 17,116
Yusufeli: 20,154

Rize Province 

Population: 343,212
Ardeşen: 41,106
Çamlıhemşin: 7,147
Çayeli: 44,351
Derepazarı: 7,653
Fındıklı: 16,678
Güneysu: 15,596
Hemşin: 2,478
İkizdere: 7,135
İyidere: 8,554
Kalkandere: 13,708
Pazar: 31,190
Rize: 147,411

Trabzon Province 

Population: 808,974
Akçaabat: 125,848
Araklı: 48,660
Arsin: 32,063
Beşikdüzü: 23,328
Çarşıbaşı: 15,562
Çaykara: 14,379
Dernekpazarı: 3,986
Düzköy: 13,909
Hayrat: 8,490
Köprübaşı: 4,851
Maçka: 25,363
Of: 43,082
Ortahisar: 328,457
Sürmene: 26,824
Şalpazarı: 11,015
Tonya: 14,116
Vakfıkebir: 27,525
Yomra: 41,516

Eastern Marmara Region

Bursa Subregion

Bilecik Province 

Population: 219,427
Bilecik: 78,533
Bozüyük: 75,566
Gölpazarı: 10,464
İnhisar: 2,414
Osmaneli: 21,105
Pazaryeri: 10,301
Söğüt: 18,167
Yenipazar: 2,877

Bursa Province 

Population: 3,056,120
Gürsu: 93,788
Kestel: 68,204
Nilüfer: 465,956
Osmangazi: 876,048
Yıldırım: 657,994
Büyükorhan: 9,666
Gemlik: 113,493
Harmancık: 6,384
İnegöl: 273,933
İznik: 43,531
Karacabey: 83,923
Keles: 11,987
Mudanya: 97,631
Mustafakemalpaşa: 101,119
Orhaneli: 19,387
Orhangazi: 79,145
Yenişehir: 53,921

Eskişehir Province 

Population: 887,475
Alpu: 10,974
Beylikova: 6,400
Çifteler: 14,878
Odunpazarı: 413,461
Tepebaşı: 370,150
Günyüzü: 5,671
Han: 2,117
İnönü: 6,514
Mahmudiye: 7,808
Mihalgazi: 3,137
Mihalıççık: 8,171
Sarıcakaya: 4,854
Seyitgazi: 13,009
Sivrihisar: 20,330

Kocaeli Subregion

Bolu Province 

Population: 316,126
Bolu: 212,358
Dörtdivan: 6,750
Gerede: 33,926
Göynük: 15,050
Kıbrıscık: 3,179
Mengen: 13,953
Mudurnu: 18,880
Seben: 5,083
Yeniçağa: 6,947

Düzce Province 

Population: 392,166
Akçakoca: 38,639
Cumayeri: 14,649
Çilimli: 19,976
Düzce: 247,419
Gölyaka: 20,179
Gümüşova: 15,842
Kaynaşlı: 20,454
Yığılca: 15,008

Kocaeli Province 

Population: 1,953,035
Başiskele: 102,241
Çayırova: 134,146
Darıca: 207,145
Derince: 142,849
Dilovası: 50,551
Gebze: 382,166
Gölcük: 165,663
İzmit: 367,990
Kandıra: 51,897
Karamürsel: 57,557
Kartepe: 121,326
Körfez: 169,304

Sakarya Province 

Population: 1,029,650
Akyazı: 90,362
Ferizli: 27,347
Geyve: 49,958
Hendek: 85,570
Karapürçek: 12,982
Karasu: 64,790
Kaynarca: 24,138
Kocaali: 22,938
Pamukova: 29,740
Adapazarı: 276,385
Arifiye: 45,375
Erenler: 89,128
Serdivan: 147,500
Sapanca: 42,416
Söğütlü: 14,088
Taraklı: 6,933

Yalova Province 

Population: 270,976
Altınova: 29,237
Armutlu: 9,543
Çınarcık: 34,343
Çiftlikköy: 41,882
Termal: 6,903
Yalova: 149,068

Istanbul Region

Istanbul Subregion

Istanbul Province 

Population: 15,519,267
Anatolian Side
Adalar: 15,238
Ataşehir: 425,094
Beykoz: 248,260
Çekmeköy: 264,508
Kadıköy: 482,713
Kartal: 470,676
Maltepe: 513,316
Pendik: 711,894
Sancaktepe: 436,733
Sultanbeyli: 336,021
Şile: 37,692
Tuzla: 267,400
Ümraniye: 710,280
Üsküdar: 531,825
European Side
Arnavutköy: 282,488
Avcılar: 448,882
Bağcılar: 745,125
Bahçelievler: 611,059
Bakırköy: 229,239
Başakşehir: 460,259
Bayrampaşa: 274,735
Beşiktaş: 182,649
Beylikdüzü: 352,412
Beyoğlu: 233,323
Büyükçekmece: 254,103
Çatalca: 73,718
Esenler: 450,344
Esenyurt: 954,579
Eyüpsultan: 400,513
Fatih: 443,090
Gaziosmanpaşa: 491,962
Güngören: 289,441
Kağıthane: 448,025
Küçükçekmece: 792,821
Sarıyer: 347,214
Silivri: 193,680
Sultangazi: 534,565
Şişli: 279,817
Zeytinburnu: 293,574

Mediterranean Region

Adana Subregion

Adana Province 

Population: 2,237,940
Çukurova: 376,690
Sarıçam: 181,610
Seyhan: 796,288
Yüreğir: 414,574
Aladağ: 16,121
Ceyhan: 160,977
Feke: 16,919
İmamoğlu: 27,938
Karaisalı: 21,948
Karataş: 23,678
Kozan: 131,633
Pozantı: 19,974
Saimbeyli: 14,764
Tufanbeyli: 17,102
Yumurtalik: 18,026

Mersin Province 

Population: 1,840,425
Anamur: 66,068
Aydıncık: 11,023
Bozyazı: 26,595
Çamlıyayla: 8,326
Erdemli: 141,476
Gülnar: 25,420
Akdeniz: 262,265
Mezitli: 204,240
Toroslar: 303,010
Yenişehir: 266,117
Mut: 62,639
Silifke: 120,873
Tarsus: 342,373

Antalya Subregion

Antalya Province 

Population: 2,511,700
Akseki: 11,484
Alanya: 327,503
Aksu: 73,220
Döşemealtı: 65,794
Kepez: 556,033
Konyaaltı: 190,043
Muratpaşa: 510,368
Demre: 26,362
Elmalı: 38,972
Finike: 48,534
Gazipaşa: 50,555
Gündoğmuş: 7,737
İbradı: 3,032
Kaş: 59,716
Kemer: 46,143
Korkuteli: 55,352
Kumluca: 70,423
Manavgat: 241,011
Serik: 129,418

Burdur Province 

Population: 270,796
Ağlasun: 8,078
Altınyayla: 5,519
Bucak: 65,335
Burdur: 115,159
Çavdır: 12,796
Çeltikçi: 5,134
Gölhisar: 22,399
Karamanlı: 8,016
Kemer: 3,217
Tefenni: 9,918
Yeşilova: 15,225

Isparta Province 

Population: 444,914
Aksu: 4,557
Atabey: 5,761
Eğirdir: 31,632
Gelendost: 15,298
Gönen: 7,185
Isparta: 264,426
Keçiborlu: 14,152
Senirkent: 11,395
Sütçüler: 10,295
Şarkikaraağaç: 25,151
Uluborlu: 6,287
Yalvaç: 46,688
Yenişarbademli: 2,087

Hatay Subregion

Hatay Province 

Population: 1,628,894
Altınözü: 60,745
Arsuz: 92,749
Belen: 33,313
Dörtyol: 125,138
Erzin: 41,463
Hassa: 56,519
Antakya: 383,354
Defne: 154,820
İskenderun: 248,380
Kırıkhan: 116,876
Kumlu: 13,686
Payas: 42,477
Reyhanlı: 100,151
Samandağ: 122,223
Yayladağı: 37,000

Kahramanmaraş Province 

Population: 1,154,102
Afşin: 80,447
Andırın: 32,503
Çağlayancerit: 23,133
Ekinözü: 11,221
Elbistan: 141,538
Göksun: 52,255
Dulkadiroğlu: 222,673
Onikişubat: 431,848
Nurhak: 12,279
Pazarcık: 69,097
Türkoğlu: 77,112

Osmaniye Province 

Population: 538,759
Bahçe: 22,155
Düziçi: 84,133
Hasanbeyli: 4,782
Kadirli: 125,083
Osmaniye: 268,647
Sumbas: 13,840
Toprakkale: 20,119

Northeast Anatolia

Ağrı Subregion

Ağrı Province 

Population: 536,199
Ağrı: 151,083
Diyadin: 41,512
Doğubayazıt: 119,807
Eleşkirt: 32,593
Hamur: 18,152
Patnos: 122,850
Taşlıçay: 20,029
Tutak: 30,173

Ardahan Province 

Population: 97,319
Ardahan: 42,374
Çıldır: 9,343
Damal: 5,334
Göle: 24,863
Hanak: 8,776
Posof: 6,629

Iğdır Province 

Population: 199,442
Aralık: 21,313
Iğdır: 140,267
Karakoyunlu: 13,925
Tuzluca: 23,937

Kars Province 

Population: 285,410
Akyaka: 10,584
Arpaçay: 16,645
Digor: 21,730
Kağızman: 45,505
Kars: 116,732
Sarıkamış: 41,280
Selim: 22,910
Susuz: 10,044

Erzurum Subregion

Bayburt Province 

Population: 84,843
Aydıntepe: 6,825
Bayburt: 68,771
Demirözü: 9,247

Erzincan Province 

Population: 234,747
Çayırlı: 8,582
Erzincan: 161,191
İliç: 8,877
Kemah: 6,697
Kemaliye: 5,106
Otlukbeli: 2,333
Refahiye: 11,593
Tercan: 16,875
Üzümlü: 13,493

Erzurum Province 

Population: 762,062
Aşkale: 23,152
Aziziye: 63,502
Çat: 16,708
Palandöken: 172,332
Yakutiye: 186,993
Hınıs: 26,212
Horasan: 38,837
İspir: 14,959
Karaçoban: 23,322
Karayazı: 27,762
Köprüköy: 15,784
Narman: 13,326
Oltu: 30,511
Olur: 6,469
Pasinler: 28,691
Pazaryolu: 3,975
Şenkaya: 17,511
Tekman: 25,723
Tortum: 18,135
Uzundere: 8,153

Southeastern Anatolia

Gaziantep Subregion

Adıyaman Province 

Population: 626,465
Adıyaman: 308,915
Besni: 76,674
Çelikhan: 15,470
Gerger: 17,552
Gölbaşı: 49,253
Kahta: 123,861
Samsat: 7,980
Sincik: 16,855
Tut: 9,905

Gaziantep Province 

Population: 2,069,364
Araban: 32,761
Şahinbey: 926,544
Şehitkamil: 794,931
İslahiye: 67,023
Karkamış: 9,806
Nizip: 143,994
Nurdağı: 40,221
Oğuzeli: 31,879
Yavuzeli: 22,205

Kilis Province 

Population: 142,490
Elbeyli: 5,986
Kilis: 118,033
Musabeyli: 13,334
Polateli: 5,137

Mardin Subregion

Batman Province 

Population: 608,659
Batman: 460,975
Beşiri: 29,667
Gercüş: 19,892
Hasankeyf: 6,859
Kozluk: 60,375
Sason: 30,911

Mardin Province 

Population: 838,778
Artuklu: 178,154
Dargeçit: 27,711
Derik: 61,706
Kızıltepe: 256,664
Mazıdağı: 36,604
Midyat: 114,763
Nusaybin: 108,172
Ömerli: 14,026
Savur: 26,583
Yeşilli: 14,695

Şırnak Province 

Population: 529,615
Beytüşşebap: 16,330
Cizre: 148,697
Güçlükonak: 12,295
İdil: 76,895
Silopi: 136,749
Şırnak: 93,989
Uludere: 44,660

Siirt Province 

Population: 330,280
Baykan: 25,275
Eruh: 18,931
Kurtalan: 60,180
Pervari: 30,858
Siirt: 168,659
Şirvan: 22,117
Tillo: 4,260

Şanlıurfa Subregion

Diyarbakır Province 

Population: 1,756,353
Bismil: 118,250
Çermik: 50,819
Çınar: 75,640
Çüngüş: 11,539
Dicle: 37,673
Bağlar: 396,102
Kayapınar: 381,414
Sur: 106,108
Yenişehir: 210,927
Eğil: 22,704
Ergani: 132,463
Hani: 32,675
Hazro: 16,618
Kocaköy: 16,106
Kulp: 35,357
Lice: 25,222
Silvan: 86,736

Şanlıurfa Province 

Population: 2,073,614
Akçakale: 115,615
Birecik: 95,128
Bozova: 55,423
Ceylanpınar: 89,020
Halfeti: 40,827
Harran: 89,798
Hilvan: 42,724
Eyyübiye: 379,852
Haliliye: 381,877
Karaköprü: 219,796
Siverek: 260,970
Suruç: 102,261
Viranşehir: 200,261

Western Anatolia

Ankara Subregion

Ankara Province 

Population: 5,639,076
Akyurt: 36,123
Altındağ: 389,510
Çankaya: 944,609
Etimesgut: 587,052
Gölbaşı: 138,944
Keçiören: 939,161
Mamak: 665,978
Pursaklar: 150,488
Sincan: 535,637
Yenimahalle: 687,093
Ayaş: 13,900
Bala: 30,280
Beypazarı: 48,371
Çamlıdere: 9,825
Çubuk: 90,764
Elmadağ: 45,557
Evren: 3,097
Güdül: 8,892
Haymana: 30,930
Kahramankazan: 54,806
Kalecik: 13,234
Kızılcahamam: 28,350
Nallıhan: 27,579
Polatlı: 125,075
Şereflikoçhisar: 33,821

Konya Subregion

Karaman Province 

Population: 253,279
Ayrancı: 7,965
Başyayla: 3,650
Ermenek: 28,565
Karaman: 197,276
Kazımkarabekir: 4,328
Sarıveliler: 11,495

Konya Province 

Population: 2,232,374
Ahırlı: 4,753
Akören: 5,838
Akşehir: 93,885
Altınekin: 14,351
Beyşehir: 74,469
Bozkır: 25,894
Cihanbeyli: 51,748
Çeltik: 9,713
Çumra: 67,282
Derbent: 4,267
Derebucak: 6,031
Doğanhisar: 15,810
Emirgazi: 8,535
Ereğli: 146,998
Güneysınır: 9,288
Hadim: 12,015
Halkapınar: 4,066
Hüyük: 15,652
Ilgın: 54,228
Kadınhanı: 32,144
Karapınar: 49,978
Karatay: 338,976
Meram: 344,546
Selçuklu: 662,808
Kulu: 50,825
Sarayönü: 27,026
Seydişehir: 64,822
Taşkent: 6,296
Tuzlukçu: 6,529
Yalıhüyük: 1,629
Yunak: 21,972

Western Black Sea Region

Kastamonu Subregion

Çankırı Province 

Population: 195,789
Atkaracalar: 5,534
Bayramören: 2,924
Çankırı: 97,882
Çerkeş: 16,792
Eldivan: 6,460
Ilgaz: 14,098
Kızılırmak: 7,304
Korgun: 4,626
Kurşunlu: 8,466
Orta: 11,978
Şabanözü: 11,869
Yapraklı: 7,856

Kastamonu Province 

Population: 379,405
Abana: 4,113
Ağlı: 3,094
Araç: 18,670
Azdavay: 7,324
Bozkurt: 9,468
Cide: 22,196
Çatalzeytin: 7,055
Daday: 8,319
Devrekani: 12,658
Doğanyurt: 5,651
Hanönü: 4,060
İhsangazi: 5,381
İnebolu: 20,980
Kastamonu: 152,553
Küre: 5,774
Pınarbaşı: 5,841
Seydiler: 4,019
Şenpazar: 4,523
Taşköprü: 37,815
Tosya: 39,916

Sinop Province 

Population: 218,243
Ayancık: 23,686
Boyabat: 44,435
Dikmen: 5,016
Durağan: 19,815
Erfelek: 11,926
Gerze: 25,327
Saraydüzü: 6,334
Sinop: 65,845
Türkeli: 15,859

Samsun Subregion

Amasya Province 

Population: 337,800
Amasya: 150,828
Göynücek: 10,207
Gümüşhacıköy: 23,402
Hamamözü: 3,802
Merzifon: 72,277
Suluova: 46,649
Taşova: 30,635

Çorum Province 

Population: 530,864
Alaca: 31,121
Bayat: 16,093
Boğazkale: 3,766
Çorum: 297,224
Dodurga: 5,931
İskilip: 31,892
Kargı: 15,455
Laçin: 4,599
Mecitözü: 14,934
Oğuzlar: 5,252
Ortaköy: 7,069
Osmancık: 42,954
Sungurlu: 48,158
Uğurludağ: 6,416

Samsun Province 

Population: 1,348,542
Alaçam: 25,430
Asarcık: 16,778
Ayvacık: 20,443
Bafra: 142,761
Çarşamba: 138,544
Havza: 39,656
Kavak: 21,074
Ladik: 16,368
Ondokuz Mayıs: 25,893
Salıpazarı: 19,990
Atakum: 215,633
Canik: 99,149
İlkadım: 338,614
Tekkeköy: 52,935
Terme: 71,492
Vezirköprü: 95,097
Yakakent: 8,685

Tokat Province 

Population: 612,747
Almus: 27,658
Artova: 8,374
Başçiftlik: 8,323
Erbaa: 95,611
Niksar: 65,308
Pazar: 13,330
Reşadiye: 43,870
Sulusaray: 7,598
Tokat: 199,815
Turhal: 79,604
Yeşilyurt: 8,969
Zile: 54,297

Zonguldak Subregion

Bartın Province 

Population: 198,249
Amasra: 14,151
Bartın: 155,765
Kurucaşile: 6,621
Ulus: 21,712

Karabük Province 

Population: 248,458
Eflani: 8,823
Eskipazar: 12,996
Karabük: 133,615
Ovacık: 4,274
Safranbolu: 68,440
Yenice: 20,310

Zonguldak Province 

Population: 596,053
Alaplı: 43,851
Çaycuma: 90,556
Devrek: 57,583
Ereğli: 175,622
Gökçebey: 21,108
Kilimli: 34,829
Kozlu: 48,507
Zonguldak: 123,997

Western Marmara Region

Balıkesir Subregion

Balıkesir Province 

Population: 1,228,620
Ayvalık: 70,720
Altıeylül: 181,206
Karesi: 183,084
Balya: 12,937
Bandırma: 156,787
Bigadiç: 49,926
Burhaniye: 60,490
Dursunbey: 35,122
Edremit: 155,837
Erdek: 32,120
Gömeç: 14,195
Gönen: 74,183
Havran: 27,857
İvrindi: 32,492
Kepsut: 23,142
Manyas: 18,936
Marmara: 9,730
Savaştepe: 17,844
Sındırgı: 33,253
Susurluk: 38,704

Çanakkale Province 

Population: 542,157
Ayvacık: 33,356
Bayramiç: 29,400
Biga: 90,418
Bozcaada: 2,988
Çan: 48,461
Çanakkale: 181,634
Eceabat: 8,784
Ezine: 30,660
Gelibolu: 44,346
Gökçeada: 9,440
Lapseki: 27,838
Yenice: 31,835

Tekirdağ Subregion

Edirne Province 

Population: 413,903
Edirne: 185,408
Enez: 10,583
Havsa: 18,648
İpsala: 27,246
Keşan: 83,373
Lalapaşa: 6,590
Meriç: 13,681
Süloğlu: 7,287
Uzunköprü: 61,087

Kırklareli Province 

Population: 361,836
Babaeski: 47,944
Demirköy: 8,856
Kırklareli: 103,042
Kofçaz: 2,308
Lüleburgaz: 149,184
Pehlivanköy: 3,505
Pınarhisar: 18,456
Vize: 28,541

Tekirdağ Province 

Population: 1,055,412
Çerkezköy: 174,529
Çorlu: 270,944
Ergene: 63,821
Hayrabolu: 32,268
Kapaklı: 120,489
Malkara: 52,453
Marmaraereğlisi: 26,007
Muratlı: 29,028
Saray: 49,605
Süleymanpaşa: 204,001
Şarköy: 32,267

See also 
List of regions in Turkey
List of provinces in Turkey   
List of cities and towns in Turkey
List of villages in Turkey

References

Subdivisions of Turkey
Districts
Turkey 2
Turkey 2
Districts, Turkey